Hans-Ulrich Lange (born 26 April 1946) is a German water polo player. He competed in the men's tournament at the 1968 Summer Olympics.

References

1946 births
Living people
German male water polo players
Olympic water polo players of East Germany
Water polo players at the 1968 Summer Olympics
Sportspeople from Magdeburg